General William Munro (1818–1880) was a senior English Army officer and plant collector, botanist and agrostologist (specialist on grasses). His botanical works included Hortus Bangalorensis and Hortus Agrensis.

Military career
Munro was born as eldest son of William Munro in Druid Stoke, Gloucestershire (now in Bristol), in 1818. In 1834 he entered the 39th (Dorsetshire) Regiment of Foot as an ensign. He was promoted and given the rank of lieutenant in April 1836, captain in July 1844, major in May 1852 and lieutenant colonel in November 1853. He served many years with his regiment in India. However, it was during the Battle of Maharajpore where he was severely wounded on 24 December 1843.

In 1876 he was given the colonelcy of the 93rd (Sutherland Highlanders) Regiment of Foot for life and on 25 June 1878 promoted to the rank of general.

Plant collecting and agrostology
Munro became a fellow of the Linnean Society of London in 1840. He conducted collecting expeditions to India (1834–1838), Kashmir (1847), and Barbados (1870–1875). His main research field was tropical grasses, including the bamboo species of which he published a monograph in 1868. The genera Munroa, Munronia and Munrochloa are named in his honour.

Death
Munro died in Taunton, Somerset, on 29 January 1880.

This botanist is denoted by the author abbreviation Munro when citing a botanical name.

Selected works
Discovery of Fossil Plants at Kamptee, 'Proc. Agr. Soc. India,' 1842, pp. 22–23
On Antidotes to Snake-bites, 'J. Agr. Soc. India,' 1848, vi. 1-23
Report on Timber Trees of Bengal, 'Edinburgh New Phil. J.,' 1849, xlvi. 84–94
Froriep Notizen, 1849, x. 81–7, 'Characters of some New Grasses collected at Hong Kong & in the vicinity by Mr. Charles Wright in the North Pacific Exploring Expedition,' 'American Academy Proceedings,' 1857–60, vi. 362–8
An Identification of the Grasses of Linnæus's Herbarium, now in possession of the Linnean Society of London, 'Linn. Soc. J.,' 1862. vi. 33–55
A monograph of the Bambusaceae. In: Trans. Linn. Soc. London. 26, 1868.

References

External links
 Biography at Wikisource
 Biography 
 General William Munro, C.B., 39th Regiment  – Soldier and Plantsman

1818 births
1880 deaths
People from Gloucestershire
British Army generals
Botanists with author abbreviations
English botanists
Plant collectors
Fellows of the Linnean Society of London